As established by Cossmann in 1885, Goossensia is a mollusc genus in family Carditidae. As invalidly described  by Ragonot in 1891, it refers to the snout moth genus Macna.

Goossensia is a fungal genus in the family Cantharellaceae. It is a monotypic genus, and contains one species, Goossensia cibarioides, found in the Congo. The genus was circumscribed by the Belgian mycologist Paul Heinemann in 1958.

G. cibarioides is a bright yellow-orange mushroom that somewhat resembles the Fragrant Chanterelle (Cantharellus odoratus), but has a very watery stipe. It is edible.

References

External links
 

Cantharellaceae
Edible fungi
Fungi of Africa
Monotypic Basidiomycota genera